The 2010–11 Football League Trophy, known as the Johnstone's Paint Trophy for sponsorship reasons, is the 27th season in the history of the competition. It is a knock-out tournament for English football clubs in League One and League Two, the third and fourth tiers of the English football.

In all, 48 clubs entered the competition. It is split into two sections, Northern and Southern, with the winners of each section contesting the final at Wembley Stadium. The first round  took place on the week commencing 30 August 2010. The final was contested between Brentford and Carlisle United with Carlisle winning 1–0.

First round
The draw for the first round of the competition took place on 14 August 2010. Sixteen clubs were given a bye into the second round, and the remaining 32 clubs, including the holders, were divided into four geographical regions. Among the clubs receiving a bye in the northern section were Huddersfield Town and Peterborough United, while in the southern section West Country clubs Bristol Rovers and Plymouth Argyle entered at the second round stage.

Northern Section

Southern Section

Byes

Northern section
Bradford City, Burton Albion, Bury, Carlisle United, Crewe Alexandra, Huddersfield Town, Peterborough United, Stockport County.

Southern section
Barnet, Bristol Rovers, Cheltenham Town, Colchester United, Hereford United, Milton Keynes Dons, Plymouth Argyle, Wycombe Wanderers.

Second round
The second round draw took place on 4 September 2010, with matches played in the week commencing 4 October 2010. Accrington Stanley were due to play Stockport County but the game was postponed because Accrington played an ineligible player in their first round match against Tranmere; Accrington subsequently withdrew from the competition and Tranmere were reinstated.

Northern Section

Southern Section

Area quarter-finals
The draw for the area quarter-finals took place on 9 October 2010 on Soccer AM, with matches played in the week commencing 8 November 2010.

Northern Section

Southern Section

Area semi-finals
The draw for the area semi-finals took place on 13 November 2010 on Soccer AM, with matches due to be played in the week commencing 29 November 2010. Due to snow, only one match was eventually played during this week. One match was played on 14 December 2010 and broadcast live.

Northern Section

Southern Section

Area finals
The area finals, which serve as the semi-finals for the entire competition, were contested over two legs, home and away.

Northern Section

Carlisle United won 4–3 on aggregate

Southern Section

Brentford won 3–2 on aggregate

Final

References

External links
Official website

 
EFL Trophy
Trophy
Trophy